The Astral Factor is the first full-length album by Swedish progressive rock band Waterclime. It was released on 20 June 2006.

Track listing
"Mountains" – 5:41
"Floating" – 4:09
"The Astral Factor" – 5:38
"Diamond Moon" – 4:09
"Painting Without Colours" – 5:50
"Midnight Flyer" – 5:17 (cover of the David Byron song)
"Scarytale" – 6:17
"Timewind" – 6:19

Personnel
Mr. V - guitars, bass, vocals, keyboards, organs, Mellotron and programming

Guest musicians
Magnus Lindgren (Black Bonzo) - vocals on "Mountains"
Mattias Marklund - guitar leads on "The Astral Factor" and "Painting Without Colours"
 Cia Hedmark - vocals on "Scarytale"
 Benny Hagglund - guitar lead on "Timewind"

References

Waterclime albums
2006 albums
Symphonic rock albums